This is a list of chess books that are used as references in articles related to chess. The list is organized by alphabetical order of the author's surname, then the author's first name, then the year of publication, then the alphabetical order of title.

As a general rule, only the original edition should be listed except when different editions bring additional encyclopedic value. Examples of exceptions include:
 When various editions are different enough to be considered as nearly a different book, for example for opening encyclopedias when each edition is completely revised and has even different authors (example: Modern Chess Openings).
 When the book is too old to have an ID (ISBN number, OCLC number, ...) that makes it easy for the reader to find it. In that case, both the first and the last edition can be indicated (example: My 60 Memorable Games).

Authors with five books or more have a sub-section title on their own, to increase the usability of the table of contents (see at right). When a book was written by several authors, it is listed once under the name of each author.

M

Marin, Mihail

Marović, Dražen

Matanović, Aleksandar

McDonald, Neil

Mednis, Edmar

Mikhalchishin, Adrian

Motwani, Paul

Müller, Karsten

N

Nunn, John

O

P

Pachman, Luděk

Palliser, Richard

Pfleger, Helmut

Plaskett, James

Q

R

Reinfeld, Fred

Rizzitano, James

S

Schiller, Eric

Seirawan, Yasser

Sergeant, Philip Walsingham

Silman, Jeremy

Soltis, Andrew

Suetin, Alexey

See also
 List of chess books (A–F)
 List of chess books (G–L)
 List of chess books (T–Z)
 Chess endgame literature

Books M
 M
Chess M